Trefonen F.C. is a football team situated in the village of Trefonen, Shropshire, who play in the fifth level of Welsh football. They currently play in the Montgomeryshire League Division One, part of the Welsh football league system.

History 
Trefonen had a team playing in the 1883–84 Welsh Cup, they got knocked out by Oswestry White Stars in the second round (Oswestry White Stars won the cup). They were knocked out in the first round of the same cup by Shrewsbury Castle Blues in 1885-86.

In 1981, Trefonen started up another team playing Sunday league in the Wem District Sunday League. Trefonen were a successful team in this league, winning a few trophies, but in 1996 the team folded due to a lack of interest.

In June 2008 the current club formed, aiming to play in the Montgomeryshire League Division Two. After a few months of hard work and time, spent on the pitch, the team played their first game on 16 August 2008, losing 2–1 to Llanfechain. On Saturday, 11 October 2008 the team played its first home game, against Defaid Du FC in the Llansantffraid Village Cup Round 1. They lost this game 7-0. Their first win came against Llanidloes reserves in a 4–2 score line.

In 2009–10 season the team won promotion from Montgomeryshire League Division Two.

On 8 September 2012, Trefonen played their first match on their new pitch, in a 2-1 win against Guilsfield Reserves.

Ground 
The current team play their games on the local public playing field, known locally as the Pit, because of the old mine situated not far from the pitch.

Honours 
Montgomeryshire League
Runners-up: 2021–22
Division Two Champions: 2009–10
Division Two Runners-up: 2011–12, 2018–19
Llansantffraid Village Cup
Runners-up: 2009–10
Derek Mills Cup
Runners-up: 2011–12
Mid Wales Trophies Consolation Cup
Champions: 2017–18
Bernie Jones Memorial Cup
Champions 2021–22

See also 
Shropshire#Football

References

External links 
 
 BBC Mid Wales football

Football clubs in Shropshire
Expatriated football clubs
Football clubs in England
Association football clubs established in 2008
2008 establishments in Wales
Montgomeryshire Football League clubs